Shunfeng Town is a town and the county seat in the southern Linwu County, Hunan, China. The town was reformed through the amalgamation of Shuangxi Township and the former Shunfeng Town on November 27, 2015. Its seat is at Linwu Avenue.

References

Linwu
County seats in Hunan
Towns of Chenzhou